Peperomia wrayi is a species of plant from the genus Peperomia. It was discovered by Casimir de Candolle in the Malaya Peninsula.

References

wrayi
Flora of Malaya
Plants described in 1912
Taxa named by Casimir de Candolle